Christmas is the fourth EP by English rock band Creeper. Released on 8 December 2017 by Roadrunner Records, it features cover versions of two popular Christmas songs – "Fairytale of New York", originally recorded by The Pogues, and "Blue Christmas", most famously recorded by Elvis Presley – as well as an original track called "Same Time Next Year?". The EP was preceded by the release of "Fairytale of New York" as a single on 1 December 2017.

Background
Creeper's Christmas EP was announced on 1 December 2017, with the band's recording of The Pogues' "Fairytale of New York" released on the same day. Speaking about the decision to cover the song, the band's frontman Will Gould explained that "Ever since we were kids, Fairytale Of New York has always been our favourite Christmas song. Shane MacGowan and Kirsty MacColl trading insults in the lyrics and the overall sad tone of the song always appealed to us – we've wanted to cover it for some time." The EP was released on 8 December 2017 as a digital download and on streaming platforms.

In a 2022 interview with the NME, Gould suggested that he regretted recording the Christmas EP. Talking about the potential release of new music, he stated: "We can't be one of those bands that chucks out a song a week, because you end up with a load of rubbish. Your Spotify is basically your permanent record. I know I've got some blemishes on there – I did do that Christmas record – but for the most part, I only want things on there that I'm proud of, rather than shit I threw out because nothing else was happening."

Track listing

Personnel
Will Gould – vocals, production
Hannah Greenwood – keyboards, piano, penny whistle, vocals, production
Ian Miles – guitars, keyboards, production
Oliver Burdett – guitars, production
Sean Scott – bass, production
Dan Bratton – drums, percussion, production
Ben Thackeray – engineering
Rupert Christie – mixing
Dick Beetham – mastering

References

External links

2017 EPs
Christmas albums by English artists
Creeper (band) albums
Horror punk EPs
Roadrunner Records EPs
Rock Christmas albums
Christmas EPs